The Powhatan class of fleet ocean tugs consists of seven ships built for the United States Navy, operated by the Military Sealift Command (MSC) by primarily civilian crews with the USNS designation. , three ships are still active with the MSC.

Ships in class
, in service 1979-1999, sold to Turkey in 2008 as TCG Inebolu (A-590)
, in service 1979-1999, then leased to commercial service
, in service 1980-present
, in service 1980-2016
, in service 1980-2005, then added to the Inactive Reserve Fleet at Philadelphia, Pennsylvania
, in service 1981-2021, inactivated 30 September 2021
, in service 1981-2022, inactivated 30 September 2022

References

Tugs of the United States Navy
Auxiliary tugboat classes
Ships built by Marinette Marine